EMMA (Ethnic Multicultural Media Academy) is a British organization that raises awareness of discrimination through media campaigns and social networking.

The EMMA Awards was founded in 1997 by Bobby Syed and "seeks to promote diversity within the media industry by publicly recognizing the levels of excellence achieved by the multicultural community, and the qualities that each ethnic group brings to the professional and commercial success of the United Kingdom as a whole".
The first award presentation took place in 1998 at The Dorchester Hotel, Park Lane, London, and was hosted by TV presenter Lisa Aziz and journalist/broadcaster Darcus Howe.

Prominent recipients include Lord Richard Attenborough, who received the 2001 Lifetime Achievement Award at the Grosvenor House Hotel, London. In the previous year, EMMA honored Nelson Mandela. Mahatma Gandhi (2002) and Bruce Lee (2004) both received EMMA's Legend Award.

The UK EMMAs are screened on the Internet in May each year and accompanied by an online voting system.
The BBC broadcast the ceremony until 2004.

Patrons
The patrons of the Ethnic Multicultural Media Academy (Awards) include Sir Trevor McDonald OBE, Dame Anita Roddick (Late), Donald Woods CBE (Late), Sir GK Noon, Lord Desai, Lord Ouseley, Darcus Howe and Jonathan Dimbleby. They have all backed EMMA since 1998.

References

Awards established in 1997
Mass media awards
Multiculturalism